Brittany Rae Steding (born March 14, 1985) is an American professional wrestler, currently performing on the independent circuit under the ring name Lady Frost.

Professional wrestling career

WWE (2018) 
Steding made her professional wrestling debut for WWE on the March 26, 2018 episode of Raw, under the ring name "Jamie Frost", where she lost to Asuka in a squash match.

Independent circuit (2018–present) 
Steding begun her independent career as the valet of her real-life husband Victor Benjamin. Later, the two would wrestle as a tag team under the name "Pretty Proper", with Steding adapting the ring name "Lady Frost". On September 15, 2018, Frost had her first title match when she challenged LuFisto for the Rogue Women Warriors Championship at an Atomic Championship Wrestling event but was unsuccessful.

In March 2019, Frost made her Chikara debut, participating in the annual Young Lions Cup tournament. On November 2, Frost made her debut for Shimmer Women Athletes during the taping of Volume 114, where she defeated Jenna Lynn in a dark match. She later lost on the same day to Thunderkitty during the taping of Volume 115.

In 2021, Frost won her first title in wrestling, defeating Heather Monroe to become Hurricane Pro Wrestling's women's champion.

All Elite Wrestling (2020) 
Frost made her All Elite Wrestling (AEW) debut during the November 24, 2020 episode of AEW Dark, where she and Jennacide lost to the team of Diamante and Ivelisse. She made another appearance on the following week's episode of Dark, where she lost to Red Velvet.

National Wrestling Alliance (2021) 
On August 7, 2021, the National Wrestling Alliance (NWA) confirmed that Frost would appear on their women's pay-per-view NWA EmPowerrr, as a participant in the main event NWA Women's Invitational Cup Gauntlet match. At the event, Frost was eliminated by Debbie Malenko from the match. On August 29 at the NWA 73rd Anniversary Show, Frost and The Hex (Allysin Kay and Marti Belle) defeated the team of Jennacide, Paola Mayfield, and Taryn Terrell during the event's pre-show.

Impact Wrestling (2021–2022) 
Frost made her Impact Wrestling debut during the July 8, 2021 episode of the promotion's titular television series, unsuccessfully answering Impact Knockouts Champion Deonna Purrazzo's open challenge. On September 28, Impact Wrestling announced that Frost would compete in the 2021 Knockouts Knockdown Tournament. Frost was eliminated from the tournament in the first round after losing to Rachael Ellering. During the December 9 episode of Impact!, after Frost defeated Kimber Lee, it was revealed that she had become an official Knockout and would be the first entrant of the inaugural Knockouts Ultimate X match at Hard to Kill. The match would be won by Tasha Steelz.

On the January 20, 2022 episode of Before the Impact, Frost challenged Jordynne Grace for the Impact Digital Media Championship, but was unsuccessful. On April 20, Frost revealed that she had suffered an injury which would require surgery. On June 23, Frost announced on her Twitter account that she asked for her release from Impact Wrestling, however, her request was reportedly denied. On November 9, Frost was granted her release.

Consejo Mundial de Lucha Libre (2022)
On October 24, 2022, Frost made her debut for Consejo Mundial de Lucha Libre (CMLL), teaming with Alex Gracia and Ivelisse to defeat Hikari Shimizu, Mei Suruga, and Tae Honma. On October 28, Frost participated in the 2022 CMLL International Women's Gran Prix, reaching the final two before being defeated by Dalys la Caribeña. In December, Frost and Dalys won CMLL's  women's Copa Bicentenario tournament.

Personal life 
Steding is married to fellow professional wrestler Victor Benjamin. Steding is the granddaughter of wrestler Tony Marino.

Championships and accomplishments 
 Consejo Mundial de Lucha Libre
 Copa Bicentenario (2022) – with Dalys La Caribeña
 Hurricane Pro Wrestling
 Hurricane Pro Women's Championship (1 time)
 Pro Wrestling Illustrated
 Ranked No. 52 of the top 150 female singles wrestlers in the PWI Women's 150 in 2021
 WrestlePro
 WrestlePro Women's Championship (1 time)
 WrestlePro Women's Championship Tournament (2022)

References

External links 
 Lady Frost's Impact Wrestling profile
 
 
 

1988 births
Living people
People from Pittsburgh
Professional wrestlers from Pennsylvania
American female professional wrestlers
21st-century professional wrestlers